Crooks in Tails (German: Gauner im Frack) is a 1927 German silent film directed by Manfred Noa and starring Nils Asther, Suzy Vernon and Paul Heidemann. A sound film with the same title was released in 1937. The film's art direction was by Gustav A. Knauer.

Cast
 Nils Asther as George Valeska  
 Suzy Vernon as Susi Holt  
 Paul Heidemann as Jean Lampion  
 Asta Gundt as Maud Compson  
 Oreste Bilancia as Mauds Manager  
 Anton Pointner as Graf Lennoy  
 Georg H. Schnell as Lennoys Sekretär  
 Mary Kid

References

Bibliography
 Quinlan, David. The Film Lover's Companion: An A to Z Guide to 2,000 Stars and the Movies They Made. Carol Publishing Group, 1997.

External links

1927 films
Films of the Weimar Republic
Films directed by Manfred Noa
German silent feature films
German black-and-white films